The George Halas Trophy may refer to:
 The trophy given to the winner of the NFC Championship Game in the National Football League.
Newspaper Enterprise Association NFL Defensive Player of the Year Award

See also
 George Halas Award, awarded by the Pro Football Writers Association for person who overcomes adversity to succeed